Sarta is a Palestinian town located in the Salfit Governorate in the northern West Bank, 22 kilometers southwest of Nablus. According to the Palestinian Central Bureau of Statistics, it had a population of approximately 3,382 in 2017.

Location
Sarta is bordered by Haris  to the east, Bruqin  to the south, Biddya to the west, and Qarawat Bani Hassan  to the north.

History
Sarta is situated on an ancient site, where  cisterns and columbariums carved into rock have been found.  Sherds from Iron Age II and  Persian eras have been found, but were possibly washed down from a nearby higher Tell.  Sherds from Byzantine/Early Umayyad and Crusader/Ayyubid  occupations can be suggested according to the finds of sherds at Sarta, and according to finds at the site of the nearby sheikh tomb.

Yakut mentions "Suratah", as being in "a village in Jabal Nabulus".  It has been suggested that this was  Sarta.

Ottoman era
The village  was incorporated into the Ottoman Empire in 1517 with all of Palestine, and in 1596 it appeared in the  tax registers as being in the nahiya of Jabal Qubal in the liwa of Nablus. It had a population of 6 households, all Muslim. They paid a fixed tax-rate of 33,3 % on agricultural products, including  wheat, barley, summer crops, olive trees, goats and beehives; a total of 1,500 akçe.

In 1838 it was noted as a village Serata, part of the Jurat Merda district, south of Nablus.

French explorer Victor Guérin travelled through the village in 1870, and found it to have around 40 houses, some better built than in  the average village. The stones of the houses  were alternately red and white. Several ancient cisterns dug into the rock provided  water for the residents.   In 1882, the Palestine Exploration Fund's  "Survey of Western Palestine" described  Serta  as a small stone village.

British Mandate era
In the 1922 census of Palestine conducted by the British Mandate authorities, Sarta  had a population of 275  Muslims and 1 Jew, increasing in the 1931 census   to 317, all Muslim, in a total of  76 houses.

In  the 1945 statistics  the population was 420, all Muslims, while the total land area was 5,584 dunams, according to an official land and population survey. Of  this,  1,858 were used  for plantations and irrigable land, 766 for cereals, while 23 dunams were classified as built-up areas.

Jordanian era
In the wake of the 1948 Arab–Israeli War, and after the 1949 Armistice Agreements,  Sarta  came  under Jordanian rule.

In 1961, the population was  740.

Post-1967
Since the Six-Day War in 1967,  Sarta has been under  Israeli occupation.

After the 1995 accords, 16.8 % of the village land is defined as Area B, while the remainder 83.2 % is Area C. Israel has confiscated 353 dunams of village land for the establishment of the Israeli settlement of Barkan.

References

Bibliography

External links
Welcome To Sarta
Survey of Western Palestine, Map 14:  IAA, Wikimedia commons 
Sarta Village (including ‘Izbat Abu Adam Locality) (Fact Sheet) Applied Research Institute–Jerusalem (ARIJ)
Sarta Village Profile (including ‘Izbat Abu Adam Locality), ARIJ
Sarta aerial photo, ARIJ
Development Priorities and Needs in Sarta, ARIJ
Sarta Village Profile
    Land Confiscation, Tree Burning and Uprooting Campaigns against the Village of Sarta, 23 September, 2004,  POICA
  Israeli Occupation Forces Embark on the Expansion of Burkan Industrial Compound, 3 September 2008, POICA
  Palestinian land bulldozed for colonial expansion in Sarta village 08, July, 2009, POICA 
Extension of Take Over lands in Bruqin, Sarta, and Haris villages 02, January, 2012, POICA 
 A new Israeli military order to grant more security for the settlement of Barqan, 25 February, 2012, POICA
Barkan colony map 

Towns in Salfit Governorate
Salfit Governorate
Municipalities of the State of Palestine